Alhajarmyia is a genus of wormlion in the family Vermileonidae.

Species
Alhajarmyia umbraticola (Stuckenberg & Fisher, 1999)
Alhajarmyia stuckenbergi Swart, Kirk-Spriggs & Copeland, 2015

References

Diptera of Asia
Diptera of Africa
Brachycera genera
Taxa named by Brian Roy Stuckenberg
Vermileonomorpha